A Ready Reaction Force or (RRF) is a combat force of the United States Armed Forces in preparation for an assistance to the military's Quick Reaction Force.

Combat Theater Base Ready Reaction Force
The Ready Reaction Force, RRF, is the first response to the military's quick reaction force, generally platoon-sized unit in the United States Army, designed and capable of rapid response to situations that develop in a very short time frame. The time frame for a ready reaction force is minutes, typically within ten minutes or less, working from a base in a forward combat zone that is generally performed by infantry, military police or cavalry units based on said unit's standard operating procedures (SOPs). These such RRFs are designed to intervene quickly as a spearhead to gain and hold ground in quickly unfolding combat or low-intensity conflicts, such as civil unrest that necessitate the defense of strategic and tactical locations of interest, an attack on a military outpost or operating base or two insurgent activity within their area of operation (AO).

The RRF is a modern military reserve, and belongs directly to the commander of the unit it is created from.  Depending on the unit size and protocols, the commander may be the only person authorized to control the RRF force, or he may delegate this responsibility to one or more additional people. RRF forces are commonly found in maneuver battalion-level task forces and above, in addition to many operating bases having their own dedicated RRF to react to threats on or immediately around the base.

The readiness level of the RRF is based on unit SOPs. Since maintaining a split-second level of readiness is draining on equipment, fuel and personnel, the RRF is postured based on the likelihood of being called up. During high-intensity conflict, the RRF may be forced to maintain that split-second level of readiness, and have all members in their vehicles with the motors running. However, during low-intensity conflict, where deployment is less likely and may be more readily predicted, the command establishes how fast the RRF must be able to react, which can range from trucks and personnel in a central location with the troops rotating out of the trucks to the vehicles simply staged close to a unit area, with all personnel staying close enough for rapid recall.  The speed at which a RRF is expected to react is defined by its Readiness Condition, or REDCON, level.

The mission of a RRF can vary widely, as they are used to respond to any threat the commander chooses to employ them for. A US Army RRF consists of a variable number of trucks, generally a mix of M1151 Up-Armored HMMWVs and, since their introduction, MRAPs. Depending on the mission requirement, additional units can be attached to an organic platoon to expand their capabilities. Examples include attaching Explosive Ordnance Disposal (EOD), teams to a RRF responding to bombs or similar threats and vehicle recovery assets to a RRF expected to recover damaged trucks.

Large Scale Ready Reaction Force
Large scale Ready Reaction Force used in peacetime such as with the use of US Army's Paratroopers (82nd Airborne Division and the 173rd Airborne Brigade Combat Team), US Army's Airborne Rangers of the 75th Ranger Regiment, United States Marine Corps/USMC's Force Reconnaissance units, US Navy SEALs and United States Army Special Forces and US Air Force's Special Tactics Squadrons, the time frame is sometimes hours to days depending on the geographical location and scale of operation. Because they are usually transported by air, such military units are usually lightly armed, but extremely well trained to compensate for their lower caliber, small arms weaponry and lack of heavy equipment like tanks and other armored vehicles that will soon follow by the larger "heavy" units that are to sustain and hold the ground that the RRF has captured and/or controlled from the spearheaded efforts.

See also
 Quick Reaction Force (QRF)
 Immediate Response Force
 Rapid Reaction Force
 Base defense operations center
 Force protection
 Eurofor
 European Gendarmerie Force
 European Union Battlegroups
 Allied Rapid Reaction Corps
 United States Rapid Deployment Forces
 Helsinki Headline Goal Force Catalogue - misleadingly sometimes known as the 'European Rapid Reaction Force'

References 

Military units and formations of the United States
Force protection tactics